Woodrow Wilson Rawls (September 24, 1913 – December 16, 1984) was an American writer best known for his books Where the Red Fern Grows and Summer of the Monkeys.

Early years
Woodrow Wilson  Rawls was born in Oklahoma in 1913. When Rawls was 16, the United States economy entered the Great Depression, prompting his family to leave their Oklahoma home for California; however, the family's convertible broke down near Albuquerque, New Mexico, where Rawls's father found a job at the nearby toothpaste factory.

In the 1930s and 1940s, Rawls became a carpenter and traveled to South America, Canada, and Alaska. He wrote five manuscripts during this period, including Where the Red Fern Grows. Rawls's scripts contained many spelling and grammatical errors and no punctuation. Because of this, he kept the manuscripts hidden in a trunk in his father's workshop.

Rawls served time in prison twice while in Oklahoma. In 1940, in New Mexico, he again served time for breaking and entering and was sentenced to two to three years. According to the Bear Grease podcast, Episode 42, Rawls was imprisoned for 18 months in 1933 for the crime of stealing chickens.  

In the late 1950s, Rawls worked for a construction company on a guided missile range in the Southwest. Later, he transferred to a construction site near Idaho Falls to work on a contract for the Atomic Energy Commission. Rawls lived in a cabin near Mud Lake. While working there, Rawls met his future wife, Sophie Ann Styczinski, a budget analyst for the Atomic Energy Commission. The couple married on August 23, 1958.

Novels

Novels 
Where the Red Fern Grows (1961)
Summer of the Monkeys (1976)

Audiobooks 
 Where the Red Fern Grows (1989)
 Summer of the Monkeys (1976)

Awards and recognition
Where the Red Fern Grows:
Evansville Book Award, Division III, Evansville-Vanderburgh School Corporation (1974)
Young Readers Award, Division II, Michigan Council of Teachers of English, Michigan (1980)
Flicker Tale Children's Book Award for the Older Child, North Dakota (1981)
12th Annual Children's Book Award, Massachusetts (1987)
Great Stone Face Award, New Hampshire (1988)

Summer of the Monkeys:
Sequoyah Children's Book Award, Oklahoma Library Association (1979)
William Allen White Children's Book Award, Kansas (1979)
Golden Archer Award, University of Wisconsin (1979)
Maud Hart Lovelace Award, Minnesota (1980)
Young Reader Medal, California of Teachers of English (1981)

References

 " Childhood Memories Relived." (1997). Retrieved from http://www.ifpl.org/index.asp?p=rawls/life (https://web.archive.org/web/20050412210642/http://www.ifpl.org/index.asp?p=rawls/life )
 Franson, jfds." Sixth Book of Junior Authors and Illustrators. The H.W. Wilson Company.  Biography Reference Bank. Retrieved from http://vnweb.hwwilsonweb.com.spot.lib.auburn.edu/hww/results/results_single_ftPES.jht
 Trelease, Jim. (2002). "Author Profile: Wilson Rawls." Children's Literature Review. Ed. Scot Peacock. Vol.80. Detroit: Gale. Literature Resource Center. Retrieved from http://go.galegroup.com/ps/start.do?p=LitRC&U=naal_aub
 "(Woodrow) Wilson Rawls." (2004). Contemporary Authors Online. Detroit: Gale. Literature Resource Center. Retrieved from http://go.galegroup.com/ps/start.do?p=LitRC&U=naal_aub
 New Mexico, Prison and Correctional Records, 1905–1958. Retrieved from

External links

 

1913 births
1984 deaths
People from Cherokee County, Oklahoma
20th-century American novelists
American male novelists
American children's writers
Place of death missing
Novelists from Oklahoma
American carpenters
20th-century American male writers